Miansarvan-e Zardalan (also Romanized as Mīānsarvān-e Zardalān; also known as Mīān Sarāvān and Mīānsarvān) is a village in Sar Firuzabad Rural District, Firuzabad District, Kermanshah County, Kermanshah Province, Iran. At the 2006 census, its population was 119, in 26 families.

References 

Populated places in Kermanshah County